Cerro Hoya National Park is a protected area in southwestern Panama.

Geography
It is located in the southwestern portion of the Azuero Peninsula. Cerro Hoya is the highest peak in the park, and the park's namesake. The park also contains Punta Mariato, the southernmost point of mainland North America.

The park protects portions of two ecoregions. The Isthmian-Pacific moist forests cover the lowlands and foothills of the peninsula, while the Talamancan montane forests cover higher elevations above approximately 950 meters elevation, including Cerro Hoya. The montane forests cover 77 km2 of the park. These montane forests are an outlier, separated by over 150 km from the main montane forest block further north in the Central Cordillera of Panama and Costa Rica.

Fauna
225 Species of birds have been recorded in the park. These include populations of crested eagle (Morphnus guianensis), Azuero dove or brown-backed dove (Leptotila battyi), great green macaw (Ara ambiguus), and three-wattled bellbird (Procnias tricarunculatus), great curassow (Crax rubra), and scarlet macaw (Ara macao). The park and its neighboring areas are the sole habitat of the Azuero parakeet (Pyrrhura picta eisenmanni), which has a total range of only 700 km2.

Native mammals probably include the jaguar (Panthera onca), puma (Puma concolor), jaguarundi (Herpailurus yagouaroundi), ocelot (Leopardus pardalis), Neotropical river otter (Lontra longicaudis), Panamanian night monkey (Aotus zonalis), Azuero howler (Alouatta coibensis trabeata), Central American spider monkey, Panamanian spiny pocket mouse, and Darien harvest mouse. The frog Craugastor azueroensis has been recorded.

References

National parks of Panama
Isthmian–Pacific moist forests
Talamancan montane forests
Veraguas Province
Protected areas established in 1984
1984 establishments in Panama